The 1936 United States Senate special election in Florida was held on November 3, 1936. Charles O. Andrews was easily elected to fill the seat.

Background
After incumbent Senator Park Trammell died, Scott Marion Loftin was appointed to serve until the November 1936 election.

Democratic primary 
The Democratic primary was held on August 11, 1936.

Candidates
 Charles O. Andrews, former State Representative from Orlando
 Doyle E. Carlton, former Governor of Florida and State Senator

Results

General election

Results

See also 
 1936 United States Senate elections

References 

1936
Florida 1936
Florida 1936
United States Senate 1936
Florida
United States Senate